Battle of the Seasons was a drag tour featuring RuPaul's Drag Race contestants produced by Producer Entertainment Group and Sidecar Management, in collaboration with Logo TV and World of Wonder.

History
The 2015 edition was called "Condragulations" The tour incorporated a rotating cast of former Drag Race contestants such as season two contestant Pandora Boxx, season three contestants Manila Luzon and Raja, season four contestants Jiggly Caliente and Sharon Needles, season five contestants Alaska Thunderfuck, Detox, Ivy Winters and Jinkx Monsoon and season six contestants Bianca Del Rio, Darienne Lake, BenDeLaCreme and Courtney Act, joined by Drag Race judge Michelle Visage as host.

In 2016, the North American leg, called "Extravaganza", featured a rotating cast including Adore Delano, Alaska Thunderfuck, Courtney Act, Jinkx Monsoon, Katya, Miss Fame, Pandora Boxx, Sharon Needles, Violet Chachki, and Willam with Michelle Visage returning as host. The 2016 tour stopped in 60 cities in total across Europe and North America, with select dates featuring an opening DJ set by Pearl.

Tour dates

References

2015 in LGBT history
2016 in LGBT history
Drag events
RuPaul's Drag Race